Charles Edward James Gunn (14 August 1885 – 30 December 1983) was a British athlete who competed mainly in the 10 kilometre walk. He competed for Great Britain in the 1920 Summer Olympics held in Antwerp, Belgium in the 10 kilometre walk where he won the bronze medal.

He was born in St Pancras, London and died in Chichester.

References

External links
Charlie Gunn. Sports Reference. Retrieved 2015-01-22.

1885 births
1983 deaths
British male racewalkers
English male racewalkers
Olympic bronze medallists for Great Britain
Athletes (track and field) at the 1920 Summer Olympics
Olympic athletes of Great Britain
People from St Pancras, London
Athletes from London
Medalists at the 1920 Summer Olympics
Olympic bronze medalists in athletics (track and field)